A peloton is the main group of riders in a bicycle road race.

Peloton may also refer to:
 Peloton (album), by Delgados
 Peloton (supercomputer), a program at the Lawrence Livermore National Laboratory
 Peloton Interactive, an exercise equipment company
 Peloton Technology, a connected vehicle technology company
 Peloton, the intracellular portion of an Orchid mycorrhiza